3d Transportation Battalion (3d TB), formerly known as 3d Transportation Support Battalion (3d TSB), is a general support (GS) logistics unit of the United States Marine Corps and is headquartered at Camp Foster, Okinawa, Japan.  The unit falls under the command of Combat Logistics Regiment 3 and the 3rd Marine Logistics Group.

Mission
Provide transportation and throughput support for the III Marine Expeditionary Force (MEF) to facilitate the distribution of personnel, equipment, and supplies by air, ground, and sea.

Subordinate units
 Headquarters and Service Company
 Alpha Company (Motor Transport Section)
 Support Company (Motor Transport Maintenance, Heavy Equipment, and Landing Support Platoons)

History

Lineage
9th Motor Transport Battalion was activated at Marine Corps Base Camp Pendleton, California on June 25, 1953.. It was relocated to Okinawa in November 1958. On March 23 2021, 3d TSB was redesignated as 3d Transportation Battalion.

Photo gallery

See also
List of United States Marine Corps battalions
Organization of the United States Marine Corps

Citations

References

External links
 3d TSB's official website

Logistics battalions of the United States Marine Corps